Mexico competed at the 2022 World Athletics Championships in Eugene, United States, from 15 to 24 July 2022. The Federation of Mexican Athletics Associations entered 25 athletes.

For the second time in a row, Mexico ended its participation in the World Athletics Championships without winning a medal. Mexico was ranked 67th place in the overall placing table with two points, thanks to Alegna González's seventh place in the women's 20 kilometres race walk.

Results
Mexico has entered 25 athletes.

Men 
 Track and road events

Field events

Women 
 Track and road events

References

External links
Oregon22｜WCH 22｜World Athletics

Nations at the 2022 World Athletics Championships
Mexico at the World Championships in Athletics
2022 in Mexican sports